Erina may refer to:

 Erina (given name), a feminine Japanese given name
 Erina, New South Wales, a suburb in New South Wales, Australia
 Erina Shire, a former local government area
 Erina Eagles, an Australian rugby league club
 Erina, a junior synonym of Candalides, a genus of butterflies

See also 
 
 Rosa D'Erina (1848–1915), Irish opera singer